The Broxbourne Council election, 2012 was held on 3 May 2012 to elect council members of the Broxbourne Borough Council, the local government authority of the borough of Broxbourne, Hertfordshire, England.

This was a whole council election in which all of the 30 council seats in the 10 new wards were contested.

New ward names

The 10 new wards created under the 2011 LGBCE review were named:

 Broxbourne & Hoddesdon South
 Cheshunt North
 Cheshunt South & Theobalds
 Flamstead End
 Goffs Oak
 Hoddesdon North
 Hoddesdon Town & Rye Park
 Rosedale & Bury Green
 Waltham Cross
 Wormley & Turnford

Composition of expiring seats before election

Election results

 Number of votes per party derived from the party candidate receiving the highest number of votes in each ward

Results summary
An election was held in all 10 of the newly created wards on Thursday 3 May 2012.

The Conservatives retained control of the council winning 27 of the 30 seats.
  
Labour managed to retain 3 seats in Waltham Cross ward albeit with reduced majorities compared with 2011.

The new political balance of the council following this election was:

Conservative 27 seats
Labour 3 seats

Broxbourne Council Cabinet 2012 - 2013

Ward results

References

External links
Broxbourne Council
LGBCE

2012
2012 English local elections
2010s in Hertfordshire